Magna Car Top Systems (CTS) is a supplier of convertible tops.  Having been a subsidiary of Porsche for an extensive period, that company agreed to sell it to Magna in late 2005 for roughly $470,000,000.

Current production of roofmodules
CTS has produced roofmodules for the following vehicles:
 Audi A5 (2009)
 Cadillac XLR (2004)
 Chevrolet Corvette
 Ferrari F430
 Mercedes SLK (R170 & R171) (1998)
 Mercedes-Benz SL-Class (R230) (2003)
 Opel Astra Convertible (2006)
 Peugeot 307 CC (2003)
 Porsche 911 Convertible
 Porsche Boxster

References

External links
 Official website

Convertible top suppliers